Sima Fu (180– 3 April 272), courtesy name Shuda, was an imperial prince and statesman of the Jin dynasty of China. He previously served as an official in the state of Cao Wei during the Three Kingdoms period before his grandnephew, Sima Yan (Emperor Wu), usurped the Wei throne in 266 and established the Jin dynasty. Sima Guang, author of Zizhi Tongjian, claimed to be his descendant.

Life
Sima Fu was the third among the eight sons of Sima Fang, who served as the Intendant of the Capital (京兆尹) during the reign of Emperor Ling towards the end of the Eastern Han dynasty ( 184–220). He was known for being well read, highly competent as an official, and generous towards those in need. He was also a close friend of Cao Zhi.

Sima Fu's second brother, Sima Yi, rose to power in the state of Cao Wei during the Three Kingdoms period (220–280) and became the regent and de facto ruler of Wei after seizing power in a coup d'état in 249. After Sima Yi's death, his sons Sima Shi and Sima Zhao consecutively succeeded him as the regent and de facto ruler of Wei. During his service under the Wei regime, Sima Fu held relatively high offices: Prefect of the Masters of Writing (尚書令) during the reign of Cao Rui; and Grand Commandant (太尉) and Grand Tutor (太傅) during the reigns of Cao Fang, Cao Mao and Cao Huan. He also served as a military commander in some battles against Wei's rival states, Shu Han and Eastern Wu. In 266, Sima Zhao's son Sima Yan forced the last Wei emperor Cao Huan to abdicate the throne in his favour, thereby ending the Wei regime. Sima Yan established the Jin dynasty and became its first emperor.

Sima Fu was known for his loyalty to the Wei regime, even after it was replaced by the Jin dynasty. In June 260, when the Wei emperor Cao Mao was assassinated during a failed coup to seize back power from Sima Zhao, Sima Fu was one of the few Wei officials who wept at Cao Mao's funeral. In February 266, after Sima Yan established the Jin dynasty and became the emperor, he granted titles of nobility to his relatives, including his granduncle Sima Fu, whom he enfeoffed as the Prince of Anping. In response to his ennoblement, Sima Fu said, "I am, and always have been, a subject of Wei." He also held the position of taizai (太宰; "Grand Chancellor") in the Jin government from 17 February 266 until his death in April 272 at the age of 92. He was survived by at least nine sons and 14 grandsons.

See also
 Lists of people of the Three Kingdoms

References
Citations

Bibliography
 Chen, Shou (3rd century). Records of the Three Kingdoms (Sanguozhi).
 
 Fang, Xuanling (ed.) (648). Book of Jin (Jin Shu).
 Pei, Songzhi (5th century). Annotations to Records of the Three Kingdoms (Sanguozhi zhu).
 Sima, Guang (1084). Zizhi Tongjian.

180 births
272 deaths
Officials under Cao Cao
Cao Wei politicians
Jin dynasty (266–420) imperial princes